Phoenix Plaza is a mixed use office complex located in midtown Phoenix, Arizona. It was built between 1988 and 1990 at a cost of US$158 million. Phoenix Plaza has three hi-rise office buildings, a large parking garage and a hotel tower. Two distinct design concepts can be seen. The façades of CenturyLink Tower, the parking structure and Hilton Suites are colored in the late 1980s design trend of combining the pastel hues of “dusty rose” with turquoise. Phoenix Plaza Towers One and Two are sleek, modern, highly polished and complement the desert inspired buildings, which share their site. The architect for the buildings was Langdon Wilson and Phoenix Plaza was developed by the Koll Company and BetaWest Properties, Inc.

CenturyLink Tower

The tower's design is a basic square with vertical setbacks on all four sides giving each actual corner of the tower three 45-degree angled corners. Adding to the postmodern element is the addition of a single bay style window centered on each face of the tower and spanning floors 2 to 23. The crown is a hip roof, pyramid design and is colored turquoise. CenturyLink Tower was completed in 1989.

Embassy Suites by Hilton
Embassy Suites by Hilton Phoenix Downtown North is an 11-story, 225-room, all-suite hotel. The main floor plate is shaped like a table-cut diamond. Guest rooms ring a dramatic atrium which also rises 11 floors. The Hilton Suites was completed in 1990.

Phoenix Plaza Tower

Phoenix Plaza Tower One and Phoenix Plaza Tower Two is in the shape of an elongated hexagon topped by a rectangular hip roof. They are finished in polished granite and red spandrel panels. Tower One was completed in 1988, Tower Two completed in 1990.

Phoenix Plaza was awarded the BOMA Building of the Year Award in 1993, 1994, 1995, 1999, and 2000 for superior tenant services and building operation.

Tenants include the headquarters of Banner Health.

Gallery

See also
 List of tallest buildings in Arizona
 List of tallest buildings in Phoenix
 Midtown Phoenix
 Phoenix

References

External links
 Qwest Plaza on Skyscraperpage.com
 Phoenix Plaza One on Skyscraperpage.com
 Phoenix Plaza Two on Skyscraperpage.com
 Qwest Plaza on Emporis.com
 Phoenix Plaza One on Emporis.com
 Phoenix Plaza Two on Emporis.com
 Hiltion Suites on Emporis.com
 Hilton.com
 BOMA Home

Buildings and structures in Phoenix, Arizona
Office buildings completed in 1990